John Tracy was a member of the Wisconsin State Assembly.

Biography
Tracy was born on April 18, 1852 in County Limerick, Ireland. In 1865, he moved to Appleton, Wisconsin in Outagamie County. There, he worked in a hub factory. In addition, Tracy owned near-by farm in the county.

In November 1879, he married Margaret Powers and would have seven children. Tracy and his family attended St. Mary's Parish. He died on June 24, 1931.

Political career
Tracy was elected to the Assembly in 1890 and 1892. From 1882 to 1890, he was a member of the city council of Appleton, serving as its President in 1887. Other positions Tracy held include Chairman of the county board of Outagamie County. He was a Democrat.

References

Politicians from County Limerick
Irish emigrants to the United States (before 1923)
Politicians from Appleton, Wisconsin
Democratic Party members of the Wisconsin State Assembly
County supervisors in Wisconsin
Wisconsin city council members
20th-century Roman Catholics
Farmers from Wisconsin
1852 births
1931 deaths